Euneo-juk or sweetfish porridge is a type of Korean porridge, or juk, made with sweetfish and rice.

Preparation 
Preparation of the soup usually involves boiling sweetfish to make stock, deboning the boiled fish for inclusion in the porridge, and boiling soaked rice in the stock.

In South Jeolla Province, the porridge is made with glutinous rice, fresh ginseng, chestnuts, and jujubes. The soup is usually seasoned with minced garlic, grated ginger, salt, and sesame oil.

In North Gyeongsang Province, sweetfish stock is first seasoned with doenjang (soybean paste) and gochujang (chili paste). Aromatics are added to the soaked rice (usually chopped scallions, minced garlic, and grated ginger), followed by sujebi (torn wheat flour dough) and vegetables such as chili peppers, kkaennip (perilla leaves), waterdropwort, and crown daisy greens.

In South Gyeongsang Province, boned sweetfish is stir-fried in sesame oil. Finely diced onions and carrots are then added to the rice and stock. The porridge is seasoned with salt to finish.

See also 
 Jeonbok-juk

References 

Fish dishes
Juk
Korean seafood dishes